Nasir County is an administrative area in Upper Nile State, South Sudan.

Economy

As in most other parts of South Sudan, Nasir County is extremely poor and lacks infrastructure. During decades of civil war, the countryside has been ravaged. Many people fled to refugee camps, and many failed to obtain education. Skilled labour is in short supply.  
The economy is based on subsistence agriculture, with unpredictable yields. The 2009 crop was poor due to lack of rain.
In 2010 the problem was the reverse, with abnormally heavy rains flooding most of the county.
Only the area within a  radius of Nasir was accessible by road.

Health

In Nasir, most of the health care services are provided by the hospital run by Médecins Sans Frontières (MSF) and partly funded by ECHO (European Commission).
A concern with returnees is that they may not have been exposed to fatal diseases prevalent in the south and will not know how to protect themselves. For example, malaria and kala-azar fever can be fatal if they are not treated in time.

Security

In June 2009 armed civilians of the eastern Jikany section of the Nuer people attacked a barge convoy on the Sobat River guarded by Sudan People's Liberation Army (SPLA) soldiers.
The 27 barges were carrying humanitarian aid supplied by the United Nations to Lou Nuer people in Akobo, where about 16,000 displaced people were in serious need of food. Four or five of the barges may have been sunk.
The attack seems to have been due to suspicions that some of the barges carried weapons. The Jikany and Lou Nuer are traditional opponents who fought a war between 1993 and 2004.
The same month about seventy-five people were killed in a cattle raid in the county, mainly children and women.

Government

In December 2009 Major General Gatkuoth, the county commissioner, said of voter registration for the upcoming elections "There are some payams in this county where people did not register due to logistical constraints and poor infrastructure, including lack of access roads that made it impossible to conduct the exercise". He asked the State National Electoral Commission to grant an extension of a few days to allow for more complete registration.

Famous Nasirians
Prominent Figures from Nasir range from famous artists to state and national political leaders. Famous people from Nasir include musicians like Gordon Koang Douth, Kang JJ, Nyapal Lul, K-Denk, Elizabeth Chol Lam, and Bangiech Ret.

In South Sudan's political and military arenas, some well-known Nasirians include Hon. Changson Lew Chang, Hon. Puot Kang, Former Gov. Simon Kun Pouch, Gen. Koang Choul Ranley.

References

Upper Nile (state)
Counties of South Sudan